Deltan Martinazzo Dallagnol (born January 15, 1980) is a Brazilian politician affiliated to the Podemos party (PODE). He was a federal prosecutor specializes in crimes against the national financial system and money laundering from 2003 to 2021.  He is known for being the lead prosecutor of Operation Car Wash, an investigation into corruption in the Brazilian petroleum company Petrobras.

Biography 
Deltan Dallagnol was born in Pato Branco, Brazil. He has a degree in law from Harvard Law School.

Operation Car Wash 

Dallagnol was part of the original, Operation Car Wash task force formed in Curitiba in March 2014.  In September 2020, Dallagnol announced that he would be leaving as coordinator of the Car Wash prosecution team.

Power Point of Charge 
On September 14, 2016, Deltan Dallagnol and part of the Lava Jato team made a Power Point presentation of the summary of the charges against Luis Inacio Lula da Silva, placing him as a "conductor of a criminal orchestra" but without offering a structured complaint of head of the criminal organization. The focal point of the controversy was the alleged statement "we have no proof, but we have conviction," which went viral on social networks as if it had existed. Officials said the prosecution was based on immunity negotiated accusations and the theories of "probabilism" and "explanationism" created and defended by the prosecutor himself to support the evidence-free evidence that remained at the end of the investigations.

In 2022, Lula filed a lawsuit asking for compensation alleging “violation of his honor” because in the PowerPoint presentation. The Superior Court of Justice Justice condemned Deltan to compensate Lula in the amount of R$ 75,000.

Allegations of irregularities 

In June 2019, reports published by The Intercept based on a large trove of leaked materials indicated that there were "legally dubious internal discussions" between Dallagnol, in the role of Chief Prosecutor, and lead judge Sergio Moro, resulting in an international furor, due to the alleged politically-based, illegal coordination between the two teams.  In November 2019, disciplinary proceedings against Dallagnol led to warnings imposed by the National Council of the Public Prosecution Service (CNMP).

Personal life
He holds a law degree from the Federal University of Paraná and a LL.M. from  Harvard University in 2013. Dallagnol is a practicing Baptist.

References

1980 births
Federal University of Paraná alumni
Harvard Law School alumni
Living people
21st-century Brazilian lawyers
Brazilian Baptists
People from Pato Branco
Brazilian anti-corruption activists
Podemos (Brazil) politicians